Whitechocolatespaceegg is the third studio album by American singer-songwriter Liz Phair, released in 1998. It peaked at number 35 on the Billboard 200. As of July 2010, the album had sold 293,000 copies.

Album information
Unlike her previous two albums, with themes of sex and relationships, Whitechocolatespaceegg focused more on motherhood and family, as Phair had recently gotten married and given birth to a son.

The album received generally positive reviews. Rolling Stone called it "engagingly intimate" while at the same time "playful and pop-y, with just enough dry humor". The magazine also praised the album for its storytelling-esque lyrics. The Washington Times wrote that Phair had successfully proved she was "no longer an unbridled twentysomething but now, at 31, a wife and mother, [who] has grown as an artist as well as a woman."

Track listing

Personnel
 Liz Phair – guitar, piano, vocals
 Leroy Bach – acoustic bass
 Scott Bennett – organ, bass guitar, drums
 Bill Berry – bongos
 Peter Buck – guitar
 Jason Chasko – bass, guitar, piano, drums, background vocals
 Nathan December – guitar, electric guitar
 Tommy Furar – bass
 John Hiler – organ, piano, keyboards, background vocals
 Scott Litt – acoustic guitar, bass, harmonica, violin, drums, keyboards, background vocals
 Scott McCaughey – guitar
 Mike Mills – bass
 Troy Niedhart – accordion
 Ed Tinley – guitar, clapping
 Randy Wilson – keyboards
 Brad Wood – organ, bass, guitar, drums, keyboards, background vocals, clapping, drum machine

Production
 Producers: Liz Phair, Jason Chasko, Scott Litt, Brad Wood
 Engineers: John Hiler, Liquid Grooves, Chris Sabold, David Schiffman, Ed Tinley, Brad Wood
 Assistant engineers: Victor Janacua, Matt Judah, Brad Kopplin, Julie Last, Chris Sabold, Al Sanderson, David Schiffman
 Mixing: Victor Janacua, Tom Lord-Alge, Brad Wood
 Mastering: Ted Jensen, Katrin Thomas
 Programming: John Hiler, Randy Wilson
 Loops: Liquid Grooves
 Treatments: Scott Litt
 Art direction: Liz Phair, Frank Longo, Jon Mathias, Mark O.

Charts

References

Liz Phair albums
1998 albums
Matador Records albums
Capitol Records albums
Albums produced by Brad Wood
Albums produced by Scott Litt